Tuula Rautanen (born 8 April 1942) is a Finnish sprinter. She competed in the women's 100 metres at the 1972 Summer Olympics.

References

1942 births
Living people
Athletes (track and field) at the 1972 Summer Olympics
Finnish female sprinters
Olympic athletes of Finland
Place of birth missing (living people)
Olympic female sprinters